Wellwood is an upcoming science fiction film directed by Eliza Hooper.

Premise 
The film centers around a married couple Laura and Nick. Laura is diagnosed with terminal illness. Nick makes an extraterrestrial discovery that he decides will cure his wife.

Cast 
 Keisha Castle-Hughes as Deputy Gracie Marsh
 Lance E. Nichols as Sheriff Bradley
 Camielle Balsamo as Laura Harper
 Sienna D'Addario as Victoria
 Reid Collums as Nick Harper

Production 
The film began production in early 2018 in New Orleans. The film is directed by Eliza Hooper with the film being Hooper's first major project as director. The film hails from Amalgamated Dynamics based in Southern California. Tiana Armstrong, Alec Gillis, Aaron Kybartas and Tom Woodruff Jr. served as executive producers. Music for the film comes from American composer/singer-songwriter Xander Singh. Cinematographer Daniel Kenji Levin oversaw the film's cinematography and sound mixers Bryn Scott Hubbard and Devin Lawrence as well as foley artist Reece Miller comprised the film's sound department.

References

External links 
 

Upcoming films
American science fiction films
2020s English-language films